Ravichander Raghavendra is an Indian actor who appears in Tamil films and television serials.

Career and personal life
Raghavendra has appeared on television and in films since the 1980s, often playing supporting roles. He has also worked in theatre. Some of his recent film credits include Neethaane En Ponvasantham (2012), 54321 (2016) and Zero (2016), and he is currently working on Oke Oka Jeevitham with Sharwanand, Amala Akkineni and Ritu Varma, directed by debutant Shree Karthick.

Raghavendra is married to Lakshmi, a dancer by profession. and the couple blessed with a son named Anirudh Ravichander, who is a famous music director. In 2014, Raghavendra met with police following a complaint about a controversial music video which Ravichander had uploaded to YouTube, and assured investigators that the video had been taken down.

He is also the brother-in-law of actor Rajnikanth.

Filmography

Films
All films are in Tamil, unless otherwise noted.

Television
 Guhan
 Annamalai
 Vande Mataram
 Veettukku Veedu Lootty
 Sollathan Ninaikiren
 Nilavai Thedi – played the role of Revanth, a chess player, who finds his lover through a series of letters sent by her.
 Manikoondu

References

Indian male film actors
Living people
Male actors in Tamil cinema
Tamil male actors
Tamil male television actors
1962 births